Hyalaethea malaitaensis is a moth of the subfamily Arctiinae. It was described by Obraztsov in 1953. It is found on the Solomon Islands.

References

 Natural History Museum Lepidoptera generic names catalog

Arctiinae
Moths described in 1953